Shad Venson Hamilton (born August 11, 1977) is an American former professional basketball player.

College career
A graduate of East Rutherford High School in Forest City, North Carolina, Hamilton played college basketball at the University of Nebraska, where he played with the Nebraska Cornhuskers men's basketball team. He holds school records for most blocked shots (241), and most rebounds (1,080), surpassing the previous record by nearly 300. He ranks ninth on the school's all-time scoring chart with 1,416 career points. He shot 52.7% from the field throughout his career. He also dished out 164 assists, and compiled 186 steals in his college career.

He was named the Big 12 Player of the Year during his senior season of college. His 335 rebounds during his senior season set a new school record for rebounds in a single season. He was also named to the Big 12 conference's All-Defensive Team.

Professional career
Hamilton was selected with the 50th overall draft pick by the Houston Rockets in the 1999 NBA draft. In the 1999–00 season, he played with Basket Napoli of Italy. In November 2000, he signed with Prokom Trefl Sopot of Poland. In January 2001, he was released by Prokom, and the next month he returned to Italy and signed with Virtus Ragusa for the rest of the season. For the 2001–02 season, he moved to Basket Club Ferrara. For the 2002–03 season, he moved to Spain and signed with Tenerife of the LEB Oro. The next season he also played in LEB Oro but moved to Bilbao Basket. For the 2004–05 season, he moved to the Spanish ACB League club DKV Joventut. From 2005 to 2009 he played with Real Madrid. With Real he was the Spanish champion and ULEB Cup winner in 2007. In 2011, he played only game with Gran Canaria. In 2014, he played with KB Besa of Kosovo and his last club was RSB Berkane of Morocco.

References

External links
Venson Hamilton at acb.com 
Venson Hamilton at euroleague.net
Venson Hamilton at legabasket.it 
Venson Hamilton at sportsillustrated.cnn.com

1977 births
Living people
African-American basketball players
American expatriate basketball people in Italy
American expatriate basketball people in Kosovo
American expatriate basketball people in Morocco
American expatriate basketball people in Poland
American expatriate basketball people in Spain
American men's basketball players
Asseco Gdynia players
Basket Napoli players
Basketball players from North Carolina
Bilbao Basket players
CB Gran Canaria players
Centers (basketball)
Houston Rockets draft picks
Joventut Badalona players
Liga ACB players
Nebraska Cornhuskers men's basketball players
People from Forest City, North Carolina
Power forwards (basketball)
Real Madrid Baloncesto players
Tenerife CB players
Trefl Sopot players
21st-century African-American sportspeople
20th-century African-American sportspeople